Brad Alan "B." Cooper (born May 11, 1984) is an American Christian hip hop musician. His first album was Cashier of the Month in 2011. He released two albums in 2014 with Reflection Music, the first one did not chart was Spare Change, and the next While the City Sleeps was his breakthrough release on the Billboard charts. His fourth album, For the People, released in 2016, was a collaboration with Deraj.

Early life
Brad Alan Cooper, was born in Florence, Alabama on May 11, 1984. He resides in Columbia, Tennessee.

Music career
B. Cooper began making music at 15. In 2014, he signed a record deal with Reflection Music Group and released his second project with the label entitled Spare Change. The very same year his third album While the City Sleeps was released and it charted on three Billboard charts.
His song "We On" (from his first album Cashier of the Month) has been featured in the soundtrack of the movie Unfriended.

Discography

Studio albums

References

1984 births
Living people
American performers of Christian hip hop music
Rappers from Alabama
Musicians from Florence, Alabama
21st-century American rappers